The Shaker Road-Loudonville Fire Department is a fire protection district in the town of Colonie, New York.

Background
The Shaker Road-Loudonville Fire Department was formally organized in 1932 when thirty members met and elected James J. Naughter President and Arthur G. Emerick Chief. The original station was located at 526 Albany Shaker Road at the site of an old Sunday School House. The original pumper was a 1918 American LaFrance from White obtained from the Albany Fire Department. A newer station was constructed up the road in 1949 and remained the main station until 1989 when the current station was constructed at 550 Albany Shaker Road. A second station was built on Old Niskayuna Road in 1972 to meet the needs of the growing district.

The department was renamed in 1957 to be the Shaker Road-Loudonville Fire Department or SRLFD.

Organization

The department has the following firematic officers:
 Chief (Car 51) - P. O’Connor
 Deputy chief (Car 52) - J. Geary
 Assistant chief (Car 53) - D. DiBenedetto
 Three captains, one for each station and a quartermaster
 Captain D. DiBenedetto - Quartermaster 
 Captain P. O’Malley - Station 1
 Captain P. Rinella - Station 2
 Four Lieutenants, one at each station for the engines and one for the ladder truck
 Lieutenant T. Besch
 Lieutenant P. O'Connor
 Lieutenant M. Mittler 
 Lieutenant J. Berry 

The chief appoints the following positions:
 Incident Safety Officer -
 Health and Safety Officer -
 EMS Coordinator - E. Cote

Explorer Post 475
The Explorer Post has been around for the last 43 years (1975–present) and is still growing to this day. The Explorer Program is for boys and girls from ages 14 to 18 who are looking to get into a career as a firefighter or Paramedic.

Apparatus

SRLFD currently has 6 fire suppression vehicles and a few auxiliary vehicles.

Station One Apparatus
 Rescue 9 (2021 pierce velocity)
 Squad 9 (2022 pierce velocity)
 Truck 9 (2021 pierce velocity 100’ rear mount platform ladder)
 Safety 9 (2010 Chevy Tahoe)
 M-480 (2017 Ford F-250)

Station Two Apparatus
 Engine 445 (2017 hme engine ex engine 449)
 M-475 (2009 Ford E-350 V10)
 M-481 (2006 Ford F350)

Chiefs' Vehicles
 Car 51 (2017 Ford Explorer)
 Car 52 (2017 Ford Explorer)
 Car 53 (2015 Ford Expedition)

District

SRLFD's district covers from the Albany, New York city limits at the southern district border to the north, covering much of Albany International Airport. It goes east to west from Menands, New York to the borders of the Fuller Road Fire Department Protection District and the West Albany Fire Department District. Locations that are inside SRLFD's district are Loudonville, Newtonville, and Latham.

Notable places in SRLFD's district:
 Siena College
 Albany International Airport
 Town of Colonie Public Safety Building
 Town of Colonie Town Hall
 NYS Division of Military and Naval Affairs
 The Pruyn House
 The Crossings of Colonie town park
 Segment of Interstate 87
 The Albany Times Union

SRLFD's district has about 10,000 permanent residents. The value of property that SRLFD covers is in excess of $9,000,000,000.

Calls

In 2008, SRLFD had over 876 calls. 53 calls involved fire. There were also 10 extrications. During the December 2008 Northeast ice storm, SRLFD ran 135 calls from 12/12 until 12/15. However, because of the high level of activity during the ice storm, certain things, such as removal of downed trees in the roadways, are not included in that amount. The true call amount for the ice storm is much higher.

In 2012, SRLFD had 706 Calls.

In 2007, SRLFD had 816 calls. Of these calls, 61 involved fire, 4 were extrications, 13 were gas leaks, and 19 were standbys at Albany International Airport.

In 2006, SRLFD has 742 calls. Of that, 66 incidents involved fire, 4 extrications, 23 gas leaks, and 23 were standbys at Albany International Airport.

How alarms are received and dispatched

There are many ways that alarms are received: walk-in requests for help, phone calls to the stations, or through the Colonie Dispatch Center.

Upon receiving a request for help, Colonie Dispatch tones out SRLFD and any other departments on the alarm box.

In the modern day, the bulky pagers that used to be carried to alert firefighters of a call are being supplemented by text messages sent to members' cell phones. This is a sample of what these text messages look like:

FIRE ALARM
E445,E446,E447,E448,TK9
123 TEST RD
MR & MRS JOHN Q PUBLIC
Map Shaker 08:15:00

Until the old Station 1 was closed and converted into a Colonie EMS station, a Federal Signal Thunderbolt 1003 siren was also used to alert firefighters in conjunction with Plectrons and later pagers, utilizing the Hi-Lo (Fire) signal.

EMS

Until 1989, Shaker Road-Loudonville provided first responder services for medical emergencies, with the West Albany Fire Department providing ambulance services. In 1989, they ceased responding to most medical emergencies after Colonie EMS was formed and put an ambulance station in their recently-closed old Station 1.

SRLFD is activated for all Echo Response (cardiac and respiratory arrests) calls and Delta Response car accidents. Additionally, the department responds to EMS calls if in the area of the call or when Colonie EMS is unavailable. A mid-sized contingent (in the area of 15–17) of members are EMT-certified. The rest are all CFR-D-certified or AED-CPR-certified.

References

External links
 Shaker Road-Loudonville Fire Department

Colonie, New York